Cemetery Dance may refer to:

 Cemetery Dance Publications, a specialty press publisher of horror and dark suspense
 Cemetery Dance (novel), a novel by Douglas Preston and Lincoln Child